The 2019 Chengdu Challenger was a professional tennis tournament played on hard courts. It was the 4th edition of the tournament which was part of the 2019 ATP Challenger Tour. It took place in Chengdu, China between 29 July and 4 August 2019.

Singles main-draw entrants

Seeds

 1 Rankings are as of 22 July 2019.

Other entrants
The following players received wildcards into the singles main draw:
  Li Wenmao
  Liu Hanyi
  Wang Chuhan
  Wang Chukang
  Zheng Wei Qiang

The following players received entry into the singles main draw using their ITF World Tennis Ranking:
  Courtney John Lock
  Issei Okamura
  Vladyslav Orlov
  Kento Takeuchi
  Evan Zhu

The following players received entry from the qualifying draw:
  Gong Maoxin
  Toshihide Matsui

Champions

Singles

  Chung Hyeon def.  Yūichi Sugita 6–4, 6–3

Doubles

  Arjun Kadhe /  Saketh Myneni def.  Nam Ji-sung /  Song Min-kyu 6–3, 0–6, [10–6].

References

2019 ATP Challenger Tour
2019
2019 in Chinese tennis
July 2019 sports events in China
August 2019 sports events in China